Aadland or Ådland is a Norwegian surname. Notable people with the surname include:

 Beverly Aadland (1942–2010), American actress
 Eivind Aadland (born 1956), Norwegian conductor and violinist
 Wade Belak (1976–2011), Canadian ice hockey player, born Wade William Aadland

See also 
 Odland

References 

Surnames of Norwegian origin